Deportation and removal from the United States occurs when the U.S. government orders a person to leave the country. In fiscal year 2014, Immigration and Customs Enforcement conducted 315,943 removals.

In the 105 years between 1892 and 1997, the United States deported 2.1 million people. Between 1993 and 2001, during the Presidency of Bill Clinton, about 1,870,000 people were deported. Between 2001 and 2008, during the Presidency of George W. Bush, about 2.0 million people were deported, while between 2009 and 2016, during the Presidency of Barack Obama, about 3.2 million people were deported.

History

18th century 
The first deportations from the United States took place in 1794 by Massachusetts, following a rush of poor Irish immigrants to the U.S. east coast, under a 1794 Massachusetts law which permitted such deportations.

A few years later, the U.S. Congress passed the Alien and Sedition Acts of 1798, under which new powers were granted to deport non-citizens. Specifically, the Alien Enemies Act allowed the U.S. government to deport any male over the age of 14 who was from a nation who was considered an enemy during war. Also, the Alien Friend Act granted the president the power to deport any non-citizen who was suspected to be plotting against the U.S. government.

19th century 
The Chinese Exclusion Act of 1882 was the first U.S. law that required the exclusion and deportation of a particular racial group. Chinese immigrants already in the country were only allowed to re-enter the country if they left with certifications. In addition, they were stripped of the right to U.S. citizenship, while the possibility of being deported remained. When the act expired, Congress passed the Geary Act which extended the Chinese Exclusion Act by another ten years, and changed the living conditions for Chinese immigrants living in the U.S. as it stated that they had to have a certificate of residence and could be deported if they didn't have it.

20th century 
In 1919 and 1920, thousands of immigrants were deported as the Palmer Raids began to take place. These raids occurred under the Justice Department, and were led by Attorney General A. Mitchell Palmer who established the General Intelligence Division within the Federal Bureau of Investigation.

The National Immigration Act of 1924 regulated immigration in the U.S. and established a quota for granting visas. Under this law, only 2% of immigrants from a certain nationality were given visas while it did not apply to immigrants from Asia.

In the 1930s, during the Great Depression, between 355,000 and 1.8 million Mexicans and Mexican Americans were deported or repatriated to Mexico, an estimated 40 to 60% of whom were U.S. citizens - overwhelmingly children. This became known as the Mexican Repatriation. Some of the repatriations by local governments took place in the form of raids. At least 82,000 people were formally deported between 1929 and 1935 by the government. Voluntary repatriations were more common than deportations.

The Immigration and Nationality Act of 1952 created preferences for immigration to the U.S. based on desired skilled-workers and family reunification. Aside from that, it also made the process of deportation easier, as it permitted people to be fined as well as arrested if they were living with an undocumented alien or rented a home to one. The rise of Mexican deportation continued during World War II, through a program established by the collaboration of the U.S. government and the Mexican government, known as the Bracero Program. This program allowed for the short-term legal immigration of Mexican immigrants to the U.S. for the purposes of filling the gap of agricultural workers due to the war. Along with that, a wave of undocumented Mexican immigrants migrated to the U.S. in search of these job opportunities as well. As a result, Attorney General Herbert Brownell Jr. created Operation Wetback, which was responsible for the deportation of around 300,000 undocumented Mexican immigrants.

In 1996, the Antiterrorism and Effective Death Penalty Act of 1996 created a new approach to deporting terrorists, as defined by the Act. It did so, by expanding the list of committed crimes that could lead to the deportation of an undocumented immigrant. It also granted the U.S. government power to deport permanent residents who were convicted of an aggravated felony. In addition, the Illegal Immigration Reform and Immigrant Responsibility Act of 1996 strengthened the U.S. border control by establishing criminal penalties for things like using fake visas and permitted the deportation of undocumented immigrants who committed a misdemeanor.

21st century 

President George W. Bush signed the Homeland Security Act in 2002 under which the U.S. Department of Homeland Security was created. Following the establishment of this department, enforcement procedures intensified with the creation of subset organizations such as the Bureau of Border Security along with the creation of the detention and removal program. During Barack Obama's presidency, over 2.5 million undocumented immigrants were deported. Obama focused on the removal of criminals, and passed an executive order titled Deferred Action for Childhood Arrivals in 2012, providing temporary amnesty from deportation to undocumented immigrants who migrated to the U.S at a young age. The federal funding for immigration enforcement in 2012 increased to $18 billion, which allowed for the immense increase in illegal immigration enforcement and deportations.

During Donald Trump’s presidency the number of undocumented immigrants deported decreased drastically. While under Trump's presidency, U.S. Immigration Customs Enforcement has conducted hundreds of raids in workspaces and sent removal orders to families, they are not deporting as many immigrants as were deported under Obama's presidency. In Obama's first three years in office, around 1.18 million people were deported, while around 800,000 deportations took place under Trump in his three years of presidency.

Criticisms 
Deportation and removal from the United States has drawn scrutiny, especially with detention and removal practices of people from the United States.

Attorneys have criticized ICE for moving children from shelters into ICE detention facilities. ICE age verification methods have proven fundamentally flawed in assigning ages to minors. ICE uses dental radiographs of third molars to determine whether a detained person is a minor or adult, but these radiographs are often flawed and the detained people, nor their advocates, give consent to these tests. A third molar dental radiograph test only estimates a general age range, which regularly crosses between an adult and a minor. The effects of these radiograph tests has led to the misplacement of the minors in adult immigration detention facilities, and sometimes even adults placed in minor detention facilities. This American Life produced a story of a 19-year-old woman who was thought to be the victim of human trafficking. After attempting to tell immigration authorities her real age, a dental radiograph test was administered to her that categorized her as a minor.

Additionally, critics have blasted the detention period before deportation while a detained person's case is in litigation. News outlets uncovered as many as 150 buildings, from government buildings to office parks, and 80 hospitals that work as temporary holding sites for detained migrants. Critics, though, routinely refer to these holding locations as "black sites."

This has also been criticized for its economic and employment impact. Many agricultural industries  especially the strawberry harvests in California and in Florida  have greatly profited from lower labor costs. See also .

Deportated  criticise it as an example of the military's abandonment of those who defend the country.

Top 10 countries of origin of deportees in the U.S.

Court cases 
In 1893, Chinese immigrants challenged U.S. deportation laws in Fong Yue Ting v. United States. The U.S. Supreme Court ruled that the U.S., as a sovereign nation, could deport undocumented immigrants and such immigrants did not have the right to a legal hearing because deportation was a method of enforcing policies and not a punishment for a crime. In Yamataya v. Fisher (1993), also known as the Japanese Immigrant Case, the Supreme Court ruled that the decisions of administrative or executive officers acting under their delegated powers constituted due process of law and were not subject to judicial review.

In fiscal year 2013, 83% of deportation orders came from immigration officers. In 1904, free speech activists attempted to defend an immigrant from England named John Turner, who was a self-proclaimed anarchist, in Turner v. Williams. These activists failed to do so, as the U.S. Supreme Court refused to grant undocumented immigrants the right to freedom of speech and defended the government's power to deport immigrants in this court's ruling.

In April 2020, the U.S. Supreme Court, in a 5–4 decision in Barton v. Barr, expanded the list of committed crimes that could lead to the deportation of immigrants, to include those who have green cards. The suit was filed by Jamaican immigrant Andre Barton who tried to get the order for his removal cancelled.

Economic effects
Deportations are feared to increase agricultural labor costs, especially in California's and in Florida's strawberry production. For many decades the Immigration and Naturalization Service (INS) and Customs and Border Protection (CBP) chose not to do any significant enforcement against those working in agriculture, hospitality, or construction. As a result of the escalated deportation raids beginning in 2018, farms in California especially were short labor. This created a vacuum for any potential other workers, and some of those entering this job area were high school students. Most of these students dropped out to join family members who were already working as farmworkers.

Some employers have declared their non-citizen agricultural workers to be essential workers as defined by the Department of Homeland Security. They hope to continue working uninterrupted and to forestall deportation actions during the pandemic.

In California specifically the state Department of Industrial Relations prohibits employers from threatening workers with deportation from the country. For construction employers this is enforced by the department's Labor Enforcement Task Force.

Deportation reduces the available employees of the country's hospitality industry. This has resulted in unfilled jobs. Haitians in Florida are especially frequently employed in the state's hospitality industry and their immigration status greatly impacts that industry.

Much of the US restaurant industry is illegal and so deportation affects the labor supply for this economic sector also. The Sanctuary Restaurants project lobbies the United States restaurant industry to obstruct immigration enforcement against their employees.

The vast majority of those who are both employed and subject to deportation are in construction or in hospitality.

The reduction in deportations of alien Indians after decades of stronger enforcement in the US and Canada has resulted in a rapid increase in Indian employment in the health care, hospitality and technology industries.

Migrants employed in property maintenance are another significant share of those at risk of deportation.

See also
List of people deported or removed from the United States

References